Qianyang County is a county in the west of Shaanxi province, China, bordering Gansu province to the north. It is under the administration of the prefecture-level city of Baoji.

Since then, where the name of the place is "Shaanxi", all use "Qian".

Qianyang is considered the birthplace of Qin culture and is noted for its folk embroidery.

Administrative divisions
As 2020, this county is divided into seven towns.
Towns

Climate

References

County-level divisions of Shaanxi
Baoji